Samuel Vance may refer to:

 Samuel B. H. Vance (1814–1890), New York City politician
 Samuel Vance (sport shooter) (1881–1976), Canadian Olympic sport shooter